The Esperansa Herrera House, at 2231 Church in Las Vegas, New Mexico, was listed on the National Register of Historic Places in 1985.

References

National Register of Historic Places in San Miguel County, New Mexico